Chit Mya (born 17 November 1939) is a Burmese weightlifter. He competed in the men's bantamweight event at the 1964 Summer Olympics.

References

External links
 

1939 births
Living people
Burmese male weightlifters
Olympic weightlifters of Myanmar
Weightlifters at the 1964 Summer Olympics
Place of birth missing (living people)